The Hawai'i International Film Festival (HIFF) is an annual film festival held in the United States state of Hawaii.

HIFF has a focus on Asian-Pacific cinema, education, and the work of new and emerging filmmakers. HIFF’s primary festival is held annually in Honolulu over November, with additional screenings and events held across the Hawaiian Islands of Oʻahu, Hawaiʻi, Kauaʻi and Maui. The festival also holds a smaller Spring Showcase in March and runs education and industry events throughout the year.

In 2018, HIFF welcomed over 44,000 attendees.

History

HIFF was founded in 1981 by Jeannette Paulson Hereniko as a project of the East-West Center located at the University of Hawaiʻi at Mānoa campus in Honolulu. Due to this academic association, HIFF prominently featured academic seminars and discussions in its early years, and was delivered free to the public. The relationship between HIFF and the East-West Center ended in 1994. Film critic Roger Ebert had a close personal relationship with the festival and frequently attended before his death.

The festival has premiered such movies as A Leading Man, Once Were Warriors, The Piano, Shine, Shall We Dance?, Y Tu Mama Tambien and Crouching Tiger, Hidden Dragon.

In 2018, HIFF launched its virtual reality program, with a focus on Asian-Pacific and environmental storytelling.

HIFF celebrated its 40th edition in 2020 during the COVID-19 pandemic with a hybrid festival combining online video on demand streaming with drive-in theaters and a small number of conventional cinema screenings.

Sections
From its early history, HIFF has maintained a programming focus on films from the Asia-Pacific, with an emphasis on new and emerging filmmakers.

 HIFF Extreme: a program of genre, horror and midnight movies run over the festival.
 HIFF Virtual Reality: launched in 2018, features a public program of virtual reality and 360-degree video experiences, with a focus on Asian-Pacific content.
 Made in Hawaiʻi: a showcase of local short and feature filmmaking from the state of Hawaiʻi. 
 New American Perspectives: a program of films produced by immigrant filmmakers and artists, produced in partnership with The Vilcek Foundation.
 Pacific Showcase: a program of films from Pacific Islander filmmakers, produced in partnership with Pacific Islanders in Communication.* Spotlight on China
 Southeast Asian Showcase
 Spotlight on Hong Kong: this section often features prominent auteurs and figures from Hong Kong, with honorees such as Wong Kar-wai and John Woo.
 Spotlight on India
 Spotlight on Japan: HIFF’s largest program section, with 17 feature films in 2019 ranging from arthouse to mainstream releases.
 Spotlight on Korea
 Spotlight on Taiwan

Awards

HIFF annually presents a series of prizes for established and emerging filmmakers, announced at its Awards Gala at Halekulani. In addition to its main competitions, the festival also honors filmmakers for special accomplishments and contributions to cinema culture.

Honors

HIFF annually honors filmmakers for outstanding contributions to world cinema and the arts. The Halekulani Career Achievement Award is given to filmmakers with an established body of work for significant contributions to the arts. The Halekulani Maverick Award is given to accomplished artists and filmmakers with unconventional career trajectories, often to rising stars of the global film industry. The Pacific Islanders in Communications Trailblazer Award honors a cinema artist of Pacific Islander descent for producing award-winning work in independent and global cinema. In 2020, HIFF introduced the Halekulani Golden Maile for Career Achievement. The first recipient of the Golden Maile was Ann Hui. Previous HIFF honourees include Taika Waititi, Maggie Cheung, Samuel L. Jackson, Sonny Chiba, Ken Watanabe, Wong Kar-Wai, Awkwafina, John Woo, Stan Grant, Steven Yeun, Keala Settle, Destin Daniel Cretton, Sterlin Harjo, Dana Ledoux Miller and Albert Pyun.

Kau Ka Hōkū Award

The Hawaiian Airlines Kau Ka Hōkū award is HIFF’s main competitive prize and is awarded to emerging filmmakers for their first or second feature film by an international jury.

Made in Hawaiʻi Film Awards

The Made in Hawaiʻi Film Awards is presented by the Hawaii Film Office for feature and short films produced by local filmmakers.

NETPAC Award

Since 2000, HIFF has partnered with the Network for the Promotion of Asian Cinema to deliver the NETPAC Award for outstanding filmmaking in Asia, and is the only film festival in the United States to present the award.

New American Perspectives (NAP)

From 2007 to 2015, HIFF partnered with the Vilcek Foundation to curate the New American Filmmakers (NAF) program to celebrate the work of foreign-born filmmakers and cinema artists currently contributing to American cinema. In 2019, this program was relaunched as the New American Perspectives (NAP).

See also
East-West Center
Film festivals in North and Central America
List of film festivals
Palace Theater
Political Film Society Awards Special Award
Shanghai International Film Festival

References

External links
Hawaii International Film Festival website

Asian-American film festivals
Film festivals established in 1981
1981 establishments in Hawaii
Annual events in Hawaii
Film festivals in Hawaii